Simon Lundström (born 1973) is a Swedish manga translator.

Overview 
He has introduced many Japanese manga and anime to Sweden, and has translated various manga such as "Fullmetal Alchemist", "One Piece", "Naruto", "Detective Conan", "Ranma ½", and "Neon Genesis Evangelion".

In 2010, he was charged by the Swedish police with possession of child pornography for possessing cartoon images, but in 2012, the Swedish Supreme Court ruled that cartoon illustrations are not child pornography and acquitted him of the charge. This case is called as "Mangamålet".

Footnote 

Living people
1973 births
Free speech activists
Comics people
People from Järfälla Municipality
Translators from Japanese
Swedish translators